Sinea is a New World genus of assassin bugs, in the subfamily Harpactorinae. 13 species have been described, mostly from the Southwestern United States and Central America.

List of species

Sinea anacantha Hussey, 1953
Sinea complexa Caudell, 1900
Sinea confusa Caudell, 1901
Sinea coronata Stål, 1862
Sinea defecta Stål, 1862
Sinea diadema (Fabricius, 1776) – spined assassin bug
Sinea integra Stål 1862
Sinea raptoria Stål, 1862
Sinea rileyi Montandon, 1893
Sinea sanguisuga Stål, 1862
Sinea sericea Hussey 1953
Sinea spinipes (Herrich-Schaeffer, 1846)
Sinea undulata Uhler, 1894
Sinea incognita Bundy

References

Reduviidae
Insects of Central America
Fauna of the Southwestern United States